Ischalis gallaria, the striped fern looper, is a species of moth in the family Geometridae. It was first described by Francis Walker in 1860. This species is endemic to New Zealand,

Description 
The larva of this species is brown and furry and when mature is approximately 25 mm long.

Behaviour 
When young, the larvae can be found along the edges of the leaves of their host and when mature tend to be found on the midribs of fern fronds. Adult moths are on the wing from December until March. The moth will drop to the ground when disturbed or attacked, with wings held motionless. The shape and colouring of the wings contribute to a most effective dead leaf crypsis.

Hosts 
The larval host of this species is the gully fern.

References

Ennominae
Moths of New Zealand
Moths described in 1860
Endemic fauna of New Zealand
Taxa named by Francis Walker (entomologist)
Endemic moths of New Zealand